Ulmus 'Nanguen' (selling name ) is a complex fourth generation Dutch hybrid cultivar raised at the Dorschkamp Research Institute for Forestry & Landscape Planning, Wageningen.  was derived from the cross 'Plantyn' × ('Bea Schwarz' selfed), an ancestry comprising four field elms (U. minor), a wych elm (U. glabra), the curious Exeter Elm ('Exoniensis'), and a frost-resistant selection of the Himalayan elm (U. wallichiana).   

Originally identified as clone 812,  was not promoted by the Dutch owing to unfounded fears that it may prove susceptible to coral spot fungus (Nectria cinnabarina). Instead, 812 was acquired by the French Institut National de la Recherche Agronomique (INRA), which subjected the tree to 20 years of field trials in the Bois de Vincennes, Paris, before patenting and release in 2002 as 'Nanguen' = . 
 has been deemed the modern cultivar most closely resembling the native European elms.

Description
The stem of  typically forks at a height of 1–2 m, where 3–5 steeply ascending branches develop in conjunction with more obtusely angled lower side branches to form an amorphous open crown. The ultimate size and shape of this cultivar remain unknown but, given its ancestry, it should make a large tree. The trees planted in the Bois de Vincennes attained an average height of 12.5 m with a trunk diameter of 22 cm at 20 years of age. 
Quick growing on moist, well-drained soils, increasing in height by an average of 80 cm per annum, the tree commences flowering in late March when aged seven years. The leaves are elliptic to orbicular < 11 cm long × 9 cm wide, the acuminate apex far less pronounced than in most other elms, with coarse, doubly serrate margins; the upper surface is rough. The leaves flush relatively late, rarely before mid-May in England. The samarae are obovate, slightly notched at the outer end, 14–22 mm long by 11–17 mm broad. The seed is not central but slightly nearer the notch, and ripens in late May.

Pests and diseases
 exhibited a high resistance to Dutch elm disease when inoculated with unnaturally high doses of the causal fungus Ophiostoma novo-ulmi, and was rated 5 out of 5 in Dutch tests. Tests in France by INRA confirmed the tree has 'highly resistant'. In trials conducted by the Istituto per la Protezione delle Piante, Florence,   suffered 19.8% defoliation and 11.7% dieback when inoculated, compared with 2.8% and 1.2% resp. for 'Sapporo Autumn Gold', and 50% and 35.5% resp. for 'Lobel'. Used as a control in IRSTEA's trials of French Ulmus minor clones, it was noted that not one specimen succumbed to natural infection by DED.

The presence of U. wallichiana in the ancestry of  poses the risk of susceptibility to elm yellows (phloem necrosis, not known in the UK), which seriously damaged its Dutch stablemate 'Lobel' used as a control in the Italian elm breeding programme.

Cultivation
The cultivar is now being widely planted in cities, notably Paris, and rural areas of France. In trials in southern England, the tree has proven very hardy, tolerant of sea winds, summer droughts, and ground waterlogged during winter. However, top-growth can occasionally outpace root development, leaving some trees susceptible to wind-rock when young and necessitating staking for up to six years.  is cold hardy, and has survived winter temperatures as low as −30° C in Sweden.

 was introduced to the UK by the Hampshire & Isle of Wight Branch, Butterfly Conservation, in 2001, as part of its assessment of DED-resistant cultivars as potential hosts of the endangered White-letter Hairstreak. The plants were donated by SAPHO (Syndicate for the improvement of ornamental horticultural plants) ahead of its release to commerce. Two lines of ten  have been planted at Wrest Park, Bedfordshire.
 was introduced to North America in 2010, with the supply of two small specimens to the USDA, Washington, D.C., released from quarantine in 2013.  is not known to have been introduced to Australasia.

Increasing  by softwood cuttings is relatively straightforward, however these lose their viability as the donor trees mature. Several French nurseries resorted to grafting onto 'Sapporo Autumn Gold' rootstocks, but this practice ended in 2022.

Natural hybridization
The flowering period of  coincides in part with that of field elm, and the seeds harvested have produced viable seedlings, though possibly selfed.

Conservation role
Over 5000  were planted on the Isle of Wight by Natural Enterprise, and in smaller numbers in Hampshire by Butterfly Conservation and the Forestry Commission, in the hope the tree would host the white-letter hairstreak butterfly (Satyrium w-album), a monophagic species which remains in serious decline as a consequence of Dutch elm disease. This was confirmed in 2015 with the discovery of the butterfly breeding on specimens planted in 2003 at Towngate, Newport, Isle of Wight (see photo 5 in Gallery).

Etymology
The registered cultivar name 'Nanguen' is a contraction of Nancy and Wagueningen, the locations of the French and Dutch research institutes. The selling name  is the French derivation of Lutetia, the ancient Roman name for the settlement which later became Paris. The name was adopted in recognition of the trials of the cultivar conducted by INRA in the Bois de Vincennes.

Accessions

Europe
Brighton & Hove City Council, UK. NCCPG Elm Collection. Stanmer Nursery.
Grange Farm Arboretum, Sutton St James, Spalding, Lincolnshire, UK. Acc. no. not known.
Great Fontley Farm, Fareham, UK. Butterfly Conservation Elm Trials plantation, Home Field and the Platt, five small whips donated by SAPHO  in 2002.
Longstock Park Leckford Estate, Hampshire | Farm Produce | The Waitrose Farm Arboretum, UK. One juvenile specimen planted 2010.
Royal Botanic Garden Edinburgh, UK. Acc. no. 20042084
Sir Harold Hillier Gardens, UK. Acc. no. 2004.0515
Wijdemeren City Council, Netherlands. Elm collection. Used in elm trials Ankeveen 2009.

North America
National Arboretum, Washington, D.C., US. Two small trees imported in 2010.

Nurseries
Europe
Batouwe Boomkwekerijen B.V. Batouwe boomkwekerijen BV, Dodewaard, Netherlands. Potted whips. 
F P Matthews 'Trees for Life' Ulmus LUTECE ('Nanguen'), Tenbury Wells, Worcestershire, UK. Potted trees, not grafted, propagated under licence. 
Les Pépiniéres Minier  (UK: gbsales@minier-nurseries.fr), Beaufort-en-Vallée, France. Bare-rooted whips, minimum export value: €500.
Van Den Berk (UK) Ltd., Discover our wide range of trees and shrubs - Van den Berk Nurseries, London, UK

References

Pictures
Photographs of the Isle of Wight's Island 2000 Trust planting  elms can be seen at the Flickr website here at Special Elm Trees and New Elms being planted out..

Hybrid elm cultivar
Ulmus articles with images
Ulmus